Tarime is a large town in northwestern Mara Region, Tanzania. The town is the location of the district capital of Tarime District. The main Tanzania-Kenyan border crossing in Sirari is less than 20km away from Tarime and can be reached by following the paved trunk road T4.

According to the 2012 census, the population of Tarime town - which comprises Bomani, Nyamisangura and Sabasaba wards - is 33,431.

References

Populated places in Mara Region